The Valtorta is a side valley of the Val Brembana in the Bergamo Alps of north Italy (Province of Bergamo, Lombardy region). It extends in a west-to-east direction from the small settlement of Valtorta to Olmo al Brembo where its river, the torrente Stabina, flows into the Brembo.

Valleys of the Alps
Valleys of Lombardy